Sveti Juraj is a village in Croatia. It is on the Adriatic coast, on the D8 highway between Senj and Karlobag. A minor road leads inland to the Northern Velebit National Park and the village of Krasno. Offshore from the harbour is a small island called Otočić Lisac.

Notable people 

 Dragutin Prica, Austro-Hungarian and Yugoslav admiral

References

Populated places in Lika-Senj County